Jodie Murphy is a retired Australian women's basketball player.

Biography

Murphy played in the Women's National Basketball League (WNBL) between 1989 and 1995. During that period Murphy played for three teams; Bulleen Boomers (1989), AIS (1990–91) and Canberra Capitals (1992–95) totaling 122 games.

In 1992, Murphy won the WNBL Top Shooter Award with 376 points at an average of 17.9 points per game. Murphy was also selected to the WNBL All-Star Five in the same year.

See also

 WNBL Top Shooter Award
 WNBL All-Star Five

References

Living people
Australian women's basketball players
Year of birth missing (living people)